Taphrina wiesneri is a plant pathogen causing witch's broom, or plant gall formations, on cherry trees (Prunus & Cerasus spp). It is an important pest species of the ornamental cherry Cerasus X yedoensis in Japan.

Life cycle
Komatsu et al. found that hyphae of T. wiesneri overwintered in symptomatic shoots of Cerasus × yedoensis. This is in contrast with the overwintering of other Taphrina species such as Taphrina deformans that over winter on leaf and twig surfaces before initiating infection.

References

External links

Fungal tree pathogens and diseases
Galls
Stone fruit tree diseases
Taphrinomycetes